This is the discography documenting albums and singles released by American R&B singer Avant.

Studio albums

Singles

Featured singles 
 2001: "Secret Lover" (The Isley Brothers featuring Avant)
 2001: "Nothing in This World" (Keke Wyatt featuring Avant)
 2002: "Cleveland Is the City" (Bone Thugs-n-Harmony featuring Avant)
 2005: "Super Saucy" (Baby Bash featuring Avant)
 2005: "Stickwitu" (Pussycat Dolls featuring Avant)
 2005: "Karma" (Lloyd Banks featuring Avant)
 2005: "Bedroom Boom" (Ying Yang Twins featuring Avant)
 2006: "Claim My Place" (Diddy featuring Avant)
 2007: "Phone Sex (Thats What's Up)" (Karma featuring Avant)
 2010: "Skies Wide Open"  (Brian Culbertson featuring Avant)

Footnotes

References

External links 
 
 Avant on Geffen Records
 Avant on YouKnowIGotSoul
 Avant on Singersroom
 Avant 2011 audio interview at Soulinterviews.com

Discographies of American artists
Rhythm and blues discographies